Beer in Malaysia started in 1968, when two leading breweries of Guinness and Malayan Breweries merged to form a new company known as Guinness Anchor Berhad. Previously, the distribution of beer in Malaysia is mainly distributed by Malayan Breweries Limited which is centred in neighbouring Singapore. Carlsberg establish its first brewery outside Kuala Lumpur in 1970. By 2007, several local breweries began to establish their presence in the country although the demands for commercial beers are much higher than a newly local brands. Beside local productions, most beers in the Malaysian markets are imported from neighbouring countries such as Singapore, Thailand, Indonesia, Philippines and Vietnam.

Regulation 
As Malaysia is a Muslim majority country like its neighbours of Brunei and Indonesia, Muslim consumers are prohibited from buying and drinking alcohol related drinks including beer. Any Muslims caught drinking alcohol in public places especially in West Malaysia will be caned and fined.

However, no canings have been conducted since 2010 as the punishment has been replaced with a three-week community service at a children's home.

See also 

 Alcohol in Malaysia
 Beer and breweries by region

References